
The following is a list of Playboy Playmates of 1979, the 25th anniversary year of the publication.  Playboy magazine names its Playmate of the Month each month throughout the year.

January

 
Candis "Candy" Loving (born September 4, 1956) is an American model. She was 's Playmate of the Month for the January 1979 issue, which made her Playboy's 25th Anniversary Playmate. Her centerfold was photographed by Dwight Hooker.

February

 
Lee Ann Michelle (born 17 March 1960) is an English model and actress. She was chosen as Playboy magazine's Playmate of the Month for the February 1979 issue. Her centerfold was photographed by Mario Casilli.

March

 
Denise McConnell (born December 23, 1958) is an American model. She was Playboy magazine's Playmate of the Month for its March 1979 issue. Her centerfold was photographed by Nicholas DeSciose and Pompeo Posar.

April

 
Amanda "Missy" Hodges Cleveland (December 25, 1959 – August 14, 2001) was an American model and actress. She was Playboy magazine's Playmate of the Month for the April 1979 issue. Her centerfold was photographed by Mario Casilli.
 
Cleveland was born in Jackson, Mississippi and attended Provine High School and McClure Academy. She came to the magazine's attention through its 25th Anniversary Great Playmate Hunt. Her death, which resulted from side effects of a prescription drug, occurred the year she would have reached the age of 42. She was a property manager.

May

 
Michele Drake (born February 7, 1958) is an American model and actress. She was Playboy magazine's Playmate of the Month for its May 1979 issue and a member of Playboy's vocal group, The Singing Playmates.

June

 
Louann Fernald (born October 23, 1957) is an American lawyer and former model and actress. She was Playboy magazine's Playmate of the Month for its June 1979 issue. Her centerfold was photographed by Dwight Hooker.

July

 
Dorothy Mays (born July 24, 1957) is an American model and actress. She was chosen as Playboy magazine's Playmate of the Month for the July 1979 issue. Her centerfold was photographed by Richard Fegley.

August

Dorothy Stratten (February 28, 1960 – August 14, 1980) was a Canadian model and actress. Stratten found fame as the Playboy Playmate of the Month for August 1979 and subsequently Playmate of the Year for 1980. Stratten is remembered for the circumstances of her murder at age 20 by her estranged husband, an act that was the basis of two motion pictures.

September

 
Vicki McCarty Iovine (born Vicki Ann McCarty; January 13, 1954) is an American model, writer, and lawyer. 
She is a former member of the board of directors of the Special Olympics, as well as a former television producer and radio talk show host. She was Playboy magazine's Playmate of the Month for its September 1979 issue and was photographed by Arny Freytag.  She is separated from her husband, record producer and founder of Interscope Records Jimmy Iovine. They have four children. She has published several books pertaining to pregnancy and parenthood under the brand of Girlfriends' Guides, as well as Best Friends' Guides.

October

 
Ursula Buchfellner (born 8 June 1961) is a German model and actress.  She was Playboy magazine's Playmate of the Month for its October 1979 issue. Her centerfold was photographed by Peter Weissbrich. Buchfellner also was the Playmate for the December 1977 issue of Playboy's German edition.
 
In her later modeling and acting work, she was sometimes credited as Uschi Buchfellner, Ursula Fellner, Ulla Maris and Ursula Maris. Most of her movie roles were in European B-movies.

November

 
Sylvie Garant (born September 23, 1957) is a Canadian model. She was Playboy magazine's Playmate of the Month for its November 1979 issue. Her centerfold was photographed by Richard Fegley. She served as hostess for one season of the late 1970s game show The $128,000 Question and later served as hostess on another Canadian-based game show, The Joke's on Us.

December

 
Candace Collins (born May 26, 1957) is an American model and actress. She was Playboy magazine's Playmate of the Month for its December 1979 issue. Her centerfold was photographed by Richard Fegley. She was a 9-time cover girl (two US, seven international), and her February 1980 iconic "eyes" cover was chosen as Cover of the Year by Marketing Bestsellers Association. Collins was also a Playboy Bunny at the St. Louis club and Chicago Playboy Bunny of the Year in 1976. The issue Collins appeared in was 410 pages, the largest issue Playboy ever published.
 
Professionally, she now goes by the name Candace Jordan, as a television host, popular media personality in Chicago, and onetime Chicago Tribune social columnist. In 2017 at the age of 60, Collins duplicated her cover along with her cohorts Kimberley Conrad, Renee Tenison, Lisa Matthews, Cathy St. George, Charlotte Kemp, and Monique St. Pierre nearly four decades on.

See also
 List of people in Playboy 1970–1979

References

 

1979-related lists
1979
Playmates Of 1979